Roes Spring is a spring in Gordon County, in the U.S. state of Georgia.

Roes Spring was named in honor of the Roe family.

See also
List of rivers of Georgia (U.S. state)

References

Bodies of water of Gordon County, Georgia
Rivers of Georgia (U.S. state)